The 2005 Isle of Man TT Festival was the 98th run and took place between Saturday 28 May and Friday 10 June on the 37.73 mile (60.72 km) Mountain course. The first week (between 28 May and 3 June) is known as the practice week, before the real action was due to commence on 4 June. Bad weather meant that the Superbike race was held over until Sunday (5 June). There were only 7 races in this year because this was the first year the smaller 250 bikes & Production models did not race at the TT, instead they were replaced with Superbike, Supersport & Superstock races.

The Sidecar TT Race A, was supposed to be race 2 but due to inclement weather forced the postponement of the Superbike TT for 24 hours, the Sidecars became the first race.

Results
Race 1 – TT Sidecar Race 'A' 4 June 2005 (3 laps – 113.00 miles) Mountain Course.

Race 2 – TT Superbike Race 5 June (6 laps – 226.38 miles)

Race 3 – TT Supersport, Race A 6 June (4 laps – 150.92 miles)

Race 4 – Superstock 6 June (3 laps – 113.00 miles)

Race 5 – Sidecar TT, Race B 8 June (3 laps – 113.00 miles)

Race 6 – TT Supersport, Race B 8 June (4 laps – 150.92 miles)

Race 7 – Senior TT 10 June (6 laps – 226.38 miles)

External links
 Detailed race results
 Mountain Course map

2005 in British motorsport
Isle of Man TT
2005 in motorcycle sport
2005